Marcus Samuelsson (born Kassahun Tsegie;  25 January 1971) is an Ethiopian-born Swedish-American celebrity chef, restaurateur and television personality. He is the head chef of Red Rooster in Harlem, New York.

Early life and education

Kassahun Joar Tsegie was born in Ethiopia. His father, Tsegie, is an Ethiopian Orthodox Tewahedo Church priest. His mother died in a tuberculosis epidemic when he was three years old. As detailed in Samuelsson's appearance on Anthony Bourdain: Parts Unknown he and his elder sister, Fantaye, were separated from their family during the turmoil of the Ethiopian Civil War which began in 1974. Subsequently, the siblings were adopted by Anne-Marie and Lennart Samuelsson, a homemaker and a geologist, respectively, who lived in Gothenburg, Sweden. The siblings' names were changed to Marcus and Linda Samuelsson. They also have an adopted sister, Anna Samuelsson. His biological father, Tsegie, the father of eight others (the chef's half-siblings), still resides in the Ethiopian village where Samuelsson was born.

After becoming interested in cooking through his maternal grandmother in Sweden, Samuelsson studied at the Culinary Institute in Göteborg (Gothenburg) where he was raised. He apprenticed in Switzerland and Austria then came to the United States in 1994 as an apprentice at Restaurant Aquavit.

Career

At 24, Samuelsson became executive chef of Aquavit and soon afterwards became the youngest ever to receive a three-star restaurant review from The New York Times. In 2003 he was named "Best Chef: New York City" by the James Beard Foundation. The same year he started a second New York restaurant, Riingo, serving Japanese-influenced American food.

In addition to his recognition as a world-class chef, Samuelsson is a cookbook author with titles in both English and Swedish. His 2006 African-inspired cookbook The Soul of a New Cuisine received the prize "Best International Cookbook" by the James Beard Foundation. Other titles written by Samuelsson are Aquavit and the New Scandinavian Cuisine, En Smakresa ("A Journey of Flavour"), and Street Food.

Samuelsson is a Visiting Professor of International Culinary Science at the Umeå University School of Restaurant and Culinary Arts in Sweden. He had a television show, Inner Chef, which aired in 2005 on Discovery Home Channel and yet another program in 2008, Urban Cuisine on BET J (now Centric). His cooking combines international influences with traditional cuisines from Sweden to Japan and Africa.

On 24 November 2009, Samuelsson served as the guest chef for the first state dinner of the Barack Obama presidency. The dinner, in honor of Indian Prime Minister Manmohan Singh was served on the South Lawn and largely vegetarian. Samuelsson reportedly sought to combine sustainable and regional foods which reflect the best in American cuisine yet evoke the flavors of India.  Harvesting fresh vegetables and herbs from the White House Garden, Samuelsson included red lentil soup, roasted potato dumplings, and green curry prawns on his menu. The tradition of guest chefs joining the White House chef for special events began during the Clinton administration.

Samuelsson is an advisor to The Institute of Culinary Education in New York City.

His restaurant, Red Rooster opened in December 2010 in Harlem. In March 2011, Red Rooster hosted a fundraising dinner for the Democratic National Committee. President Obama attended the dinner. The $30,800-per-plate event raised $1.5 million.

In the fall of 2012, Samuelsson, together with Clarion Hotels, launched a restaurant concept called Kitchen & Table. The concept's first restaurant opened at Clarion Hotel Arlanda Airport and from 2013 to 2014 it was held at all Clarion Hotels in Sweden and Norway.

In spring 2015, Samuelsson opened his second Harlem restaurant, Streetbird Rotisserie, a kitchenette with a menu inspired by cookouts focusing on fried and rotisserie chicken, and décor paying tribute to the hip-hop culture of Harlem. In 2015, Marcus partnered with the Hamilton Princess & Beach Club to open the restaurant Marcus' in the Bermuda hotel. The restaurant re-opened with a new menu and decor in March 2017. In late 2016, Samuelsson opened Marcus at MGM National Harbor in Oxon Hill, Md. and developed the room-service menu for the hotel. In November 2017 he opened a new restaurant, Marcus B&P on Halsey Street in Newark, New Jersey.

In spring 2019, Samuelsson announced the opening of Marcus at The Four Seasons Hotel in Montreal.

Media appearances

Samuelsson has been featured on television including on CNN, MSNBC's The Dylan Ratigan Show; he has been a judge on Guy's Grocery Games, Top Chef, Iron Chef USA, Iron Chef America, and Chopped making frequent guest appearances on Today. He previously hosted his own television shows, The Inner Chef  and Urban Cuisine. He was also a judge on the TV One show My Momma Throws Down.

In early 2010, he competed alongside 21 world-renowned chefs on Bravo's television series Top Chef Masters. Samuelsson won the competition, earning $115,000 for UNICEF's grassroots effort The Tap Project. In 2011, he was a contestant on the fourth season of The Next Iron Chef competing against nine other chefs for the opportunity to be designated an "Iron Chef" and appear regularly on Iron Chef America. Samuelsson was eliminated in the fifth episode, finishing in sixth place.

After appearing consistently as a culinary judge on the Food Network show Chopped, Samuelsson competed in and won Chopped All Stars 2012: Judges Remix. He was awarded the grand prize of $50,000 for his charity, the Careers Through Culinary Arts Program. Samuelsson is a regular guest judge on Food Network shows Chopped, Chopped Junior, Beat Bobby Flay, Cooks vs. Cons, The Kitchen, and Star Plates.

On 28 June 2012, Samuelsson was the subject of an extensive interview on Fresh Air with Terry Gross on NPR.

In 2014, he made his debut as a judge on the second season of the American television series The Taste.

In 2015, he appeared in an episode of Anthony Bourdain: Parts Unknown with Ethiopia being the focus of that episode's visit.

Samuelsson appeared on 8 October 2016 episode of the radio show Wait Wait... Don't Tell Me!. He appeared on the Another Round podcast in June 2017.

In 2016, Samuelsson began making occasional appearances in videos produced for BuzzFeed's Tasty video series mostly providing food demonstrations as well as making a guest appearance in an episode of BuzzFeed's flagship food series Worth It in a segment filmed at Red Rooster where his fried chicken was declared series creator Steven Lim's personal "Worth It winner". In August 2018, Samuelsson officially joined Tasty as executive chef-in-residence.

In May 2017, Marcus Samuelsson appeared in the final episode of Undercover Boss to find and mentor new culinary talent.

Samuelsson appears as himself in the 2018 movie Scooby-Doo! and the Gourmet Ghost.

On April 22, 2019, Samuelsson appeared on Top Chef Canada Season 7, Episode 4 as a guest judge for a Nordic ingredients challenge.

On October 13, 2020, Samuelsson was introduced as the global brand advisor for Bon Appétit.

No Passport Required

In July 2018, Samuelsson premiered a six-part series called No Passport Required on PBS. The series highlights and celebrates immigrant cultures and foods found in the United States. Samuelsson is both the host and executive producer of the series. In 2019, PBS announced that the series was renewed for a second six-episode season.

Episodes

Season 1 (2018)

Season 2 (2019–20)

Books

Samuelsson has released cookbooks New American Table, The Soul of a New Cuisine, Marcus Off Duty, and The Red Rooster Cookbook.

In 2012, Samuelsson released Yes, Chef a memoir co-written with journalist Veronica Chambers about Samuelsson's early life and trajectory to becoming a chef. The book gained favorable reviews and won the James Beard Foundation award for Writing and Literature related to food.

After the success of Yes, Chef in 2015 Samuelsson published Make it Messy: My Perfectly Imperfect Life, aimed at young adults.

In 2020, Sameulsson released The Rise, a cookbook with Osayi Endolyn, Yewande Komolafe, Tamie Cook, and Angie Mosier. In interviews about the book, Samuelsson describes the book as a means to share the Black experience in food history.

Personal life

Samuelsson is married to the model Gate (Maya) Haile. Their wedding was in Addis Ababa, Ethiopia. They live in Harlem. They have one son, Zion Mandela, and a daughter, Grace Ethiopia. Samuelsson also has an adult daughter. Samuelsson serves on the board at City Harvest and serves as co-chair of the board of directors for Careers Through Culinary Arts Program (C-CAP). He also has been a UNICEF ambassador since 2000, and he and his wife are the co-founders of the Three Goats Organization. Samuelsson is a keen soccer (association football) fan and an avid supporter of Arsenal F.C. (London, England).

References

External links

 Townhouse Restaurant Group
 Red Rooster
 Aquavit
 Biography, StarChefs.com

1970 births
Living people
Swedish adoptees
Swedish television chefs
Swedish restaurateurs
American television chefs
Food Network chefs
American male chefs
Ethiopian chefs
Academic staff of Umeå University
Swedish people of Ethiopian descent
Swedish emigrants to the United States
Top Chef winners
Participants in American reality television series
James Beard Foundation Award winners